House of Greed is a 1933 Soviet film directed by Aleksandr Ivanovsky, based on Mikhail Saltykov-Shchedrin's novel The Golovlyov Family.

Plot 
Porfiriy Golovlyov, nicknamed Iudushka for hypocrisy, becomes the heir to a rich estate. But wealth does not bring happiness to him or his family. A son and nieces of Iudushka  die in poverty and humiliation, without waiting for help from a rich relative.

Cast
 Vladimir Gardin as Porfiriy Golovlyov 
 Tatyana Bulakh-Gardina as Annenka  
 Nina Latonina as Lyubinka
 Yekaterina Korchagina-Aleksandrovskaya as Ulita  
 Mikhail Tarkhanov as Derunov  
 Irina Zarubina as Evprakseya 
 Vladimir Taskin as Petenka  
 Pavel Bogdanov as Kukishev  
 Vera Streshnyova as Galkina  
 Nadezhda Skarskaya as Grandmother

References

External links 

1933 films
1930s Russian-language films
Soviet black-and-white films
Soviet drama films
1933 drama films
Films based on Russian novels